Brunswick County is the southernmost county in the U.S. state of North Carolina. As of the 2020 census, the population was 136,693. Its population was only 73,143 in 2000, making it one of the fastest-growing counties in the state. With a nominal growth rate of approximately 47% in ten years, much of the growth is centered in the eastern section of the county in the suburbs of Wilmington such as Leland, Belville and Southport. A 2019 estimated population of 142,820 makes Brunswick the fourth-fastest-growing county in the country. The county seat is Bolivia, which at a population of around 150 people is among the least populous county seats in the state.

Brunswick County is included in the Myrtle Beach-Conway-North Myrtle Beach, SC-NC Metropolitan Statistical Area. It was formerly part of the Wilmington, NC Metropolitan Statistical Area. Brunswick County and Wilmington area leaders disputed the change, but unsuccessfully.

Much of the economy of the county is built around tourism, with beach communities lying along the south-facing beaches past Cape Fear such as Bald Head Island (the southernmost point of North Carolina) and Oak Island being popular destinations.  Calabash, on the border of South Carolina, is renowned for its fried seafood, with "Calabash-style" restaurants dotting the region.  The proximity to EUE/Screen Gems Studios in nearby Wilmington has made Brunswick County a popular filming location for many movies and TV shows.

History
The county was formed in 1764 from parts of Bladen County and New Hanover County.  It was named for the colonial port of Brunswick Town (now in ruins) which itself was named for Duchy of Brunswick-Lüneburg; at the time held by the British kings of the House of Hanover.

Geography

It is the fourth-largest county in North Carolina by total area. The Brunswick River and the Cape Fear River provide access to the Atlantic Ocean.

The Brunswick Nuclear Generating Station is to the north of Southport.

Hydrogeology
The principal ground-water-supply sources for Brunswick County are the surficial aquifer for domestic supplies and the Castle Hayne aquifer for municipal supplies.

Beaches
 Caswell Beach
 Holden Beach
 Long Beach
 Ocean Isle Beach
 Sunset Beach
 Yaupon Beach

Islands
 Bald Head Island
 Bird Island
 Oak Island

Major water bodies 
 Alligator Creek
 Atlantic Ocean
 Black River, home of the oldest documented Taxodium distichum (bald cypress) at  years old, located in Bladen County
 Brunswick River
 Cape Fear River
 Elizabeth River
 Frying Pan Shoals
 Intracoastal Waterway
 Lockwood Folly River
 Little River
 Long Bay
 North Lake
 Northeast Cape Fear River
 Onslow Bay
 Orton Pond
 Patricia Lake
 Saucepan Creek
 Shallotte River
 Waccamaw River

State and local protected area/sites 
 Bald Head Island Natural Area
 Bald Head Woods Maritime Forest Preserve
 Bird Island Reserve
 Brunswick Nature Park
 Brunswick Town/Fort Anderson State Historic Site
 Ev-Henwood Nature Preserve
 Green Swamp Preserve (part)
 Myrtle Head Savanna
 Oak Island Lighthouse
 Old Baldy Lighthouse and Smith Island Museum
 Orton Creek Preserve
 South of Onslow County Mechanical Harvesting of Oysters Prohibited Area (part)
 Zekes Island Estuarine Reserve Dedicated Nature Preserve (part)
 Zeke's Island Reserve (part)

Adjacent counties
 Pender County - north
 New Hanover County - east
 Columbus County - west-northwest
 Horry County, South Carolina - west

Major highways

  (Concurrency with US 74/76, NC 211, and US 17)
 
 
  (Bolivia)
  (Shallotte)

Major infrastructure 
 Cape Fear Regional Jetport, near Oak Island
 Fort Fisher - Southport Ferry (To New Hanover County)
 MCAS Sunny Point, military base and terminal near Southport.
 Odell Williamson Municipal Airport
 Southport - Bald Head Island Ferry, Private ferry that services Bald Head Island.

Demographics

2020 census

As of the 2020 United States census, there were 136,693 people, 59,416 households, and 39,806 families residing in the county.

2000 census
As of the census of 2000, there were 73,143 people, 30,438 households, and 22,037 families residing in the county.  The population density was 86 people per square mile (33/km2).  There were 51,431 housing units at an average density of 60 per square mile (23/km2).  The racial makeup of the county was 82.30% White, 14.38% Black or African American, 0.68% Native American, 0.27% Asian, 0.04% Pacific Islander, 1.32% from other races, and 1.01% from two or more races.  2.68% of the population were Hispanic or Latino of any race.

There were 30,438 households, out of which 25.70% had children under the age of 18 living with them, 58.10% were married couples living together, 10.20% had a female householder with no husband present, and 27.60% were non-families. 22.90% of all households were made up of individuals, and 8.60% had someone living alone who was 65 years of age or older.  The average household size was 2.38 and the average family size was 2.76.

In the county, the population was spread out, with 21.20% under the age of 18, 7.00% from 18 to 24, 25.70% from 25 to 44, 29.20% from 45 to 64, and 16.90% who were 65 years of age or older.  The median age was 42 years. For every 100 females there were 96.70 males.  For every 100 females age 18 and over, there were 94.90 males.

The median income for a household in the county was $35,888, and the median income for a family was $42,037. Males had a median income of $30,138 versus $22,066 for females. The per capita income for the county was $19,857.  About 9.50% of families and 12.60% of the population were below the poverty line, including 19.40% of those under age 18 and 8.10% of those age 65 or over.

Government and politics
Brunswick County is a member of the regional Cape Fear Council of Governments. The county lies in the inner coastal plain, most of which was highly pro-secession, and part of the Democratic “Solid South” from the late 19th century through 1964. However, Brunswick County was less fertile than the “Black Belt” and consequently had significant pro-Union and Populist sympathies. The county frequently backed Republicans at state and local levels even when the state was consistently Democratic apart from Herbert Hoover’s 1928 victory. Only three times since the Civil War – Grover Cleveland in 1888, Alton B. Parker in 1904 and Jimmy Carter in 1980 – has Brunswick County backed a losing Democratic presidential candidate. Carter in that 1980 election remains the last Democrat to win a majority of Brunswick County’s ballots, although Bill Clinton won a plurality in 1992.

Communities

Cities
 Boiling Spring Lakes
 Northwest
 Southport
 Leland (largest city)

Towns

 Belville
 Bolivia (county seat)
 Calabash
 Carolina Shores
 Caswell Beach
 Holden Beach
 Leland
 Navassa
 Oak Island
 Ocean Isle Beach
 Sandy Creek
 Shallotte
 St. James
 Sunset Beach
 Varnamtown

Village
 Bald Head Island

Townships
 Lockwoods Folly
 Northwest
 Shalotte
 Smithville
 Town Creek
 Waccamaw

Unincorporated communities

 Antioch
 Ash
 Batarora
 Bell Swamp
 Bishop
 Biven
 Bonaparte Landing
 Boone's Neck
 Bowensville
 Brunswick Station
 Camp Branch
 Cedar Grove
 Civietown
 Clairmont
 Clarendon
 Coolvale
 Doe Creek
 Eastbrook
 Easy Hill
 Half Hell
 Longwood
 Maco
 Piney Grove
 Red Bug
 Sunset Harbor
 Supply
 Thomasboro
 Winnabow

See also
 List of counties in North Carolina
 National Register of Historic Places listings in Brunswick County, North Carolina
 Films and television shows produced in Wilmington, North Carolina
 Cape Fear Museum, located in Wilmington
 North Carolina Ferry System
 List of North Carolina State Parks#State Natural Areas
 List of future Interstate Highways
 Colcor, political corruption investigation carried out in neighboring Columbus County
 GenX, chemical compound found in the Cape Fear River south of Fayetteville

References

External links

 
 

 
Cape Fear (region)
1764 establishments in North Carolina
Populated places established in 1764